Jonny Z is an American hip hop artist and producer.

Career 
Jonny Z first began working with producer Doug Rasheed in the mid 1990s. He scored his first hit when "Shake Shake (Shake Your Culo)" reached #38 on the U.S. Billboard Hot Dance Music chart.

In 1996 he released "Latin Swing" which peaked at #43 on the Billboard Hot Dance Music Chart.

His debut album, Jonny Z, was released in December 1996. It featured "No Senor (Drop Your Chones)", which reached #38 on the Billboard Hot Dance Singles chart, and "Mamacita", which reached #51.

He recorded a Latino version of Rodney O and Joe Cooley's "Everlasting Bass"  entitled "Puro Latin Bass", featuring South Park Mexican a.k.a. SPM.

He then established his own label "One Lil Vato". His singles "Ku-Ku" and "Te La Pongo" were released by Jellybean Benitez's label, Jellybean Recordings, in 2001.

Legacy 
Jonny Z is considered to be a pioneer of Latin Hip-Hop, due to him being one of the first Latinos combining bass music with salsa, mambo, and regional Mexican banda. The Oxford encyclopedia of Latinos and Latinas in the United States - Volume 2 - Page 301 states:
"A new style of Latina and Latino hip-hop was created in Miami and Texas by the bass rappers DJ Laz and Jonny Z, who mixed Latin styles with bass music".... Besides bass music, he also recorded some funk-influenced hip hop on his earlier albums. Among those early tracks, the Chicano anthem "Orale". He also was the first Latino American to incorporate not only Spanglish in his raps, but more explicit words and phrases. Words like "Culo" and "Nalgas", and "Chones". Phrases like "Vamos a la cama", and "Se me Paro". This opened the door of acceptability at radio stations across the U.S. He was truly the original Latin rap rebel. 
Jonny Z's records continue to be aired frequently on major radio stations across the U.S. including KBBT San Antonio, and KYLD San Francisco.

Discography

 Jonny Z (1996) Pump Records/Quality Records
 Sancho Villa (1999) One Lil Vato Records
 Z 1 N Only (1998) Pump Records
 Bass Balla (2000) Thump Records
 El Catrin (2000) Thump Records
 Hits and More (2000)
 Greatest Hits (2000)
 Barrio Knights (2003)

Billboard Charts

Notes and references

American male rappers
American rappers of Mexican descent
Chicano rap
Hip hop record producers
Hispanic and Latino American rappers
Living people
Rappers from San Diego
Year of birth missing (living people)
21st-century American rappers
21st-century American male musicians